Victor Johansen (born 16 June 1994) is a Norwegian footballer who plays for Lyn.
He has previously played for Molde and Vålerenga and is the son of the former Vålerenga-player and journalist Viggo Johansen.

Career
Johansen is the son of the former Vålerenga-player and journalist Viggo Johansen and was born in Brussels. Johansen grew up in Oslo and played for Lyn throughout his youth, but joined Vålerenga ahead of the 2010-season, following the bankruptcy of Lyn.

In April 2010, Johansen signed a professional contract with Vålerenga and on 16 October 2011 he made his debut in Tippeligaen against Strømsgodset. In December 2011 he signed for the Tippeligaen 2011-winners Molde. Johansen made his debut for Molde when he played 90 minutes against Steaua București in the Europa League on 25 October 2012.

On 5 August 2014, Molde FK and Johansen agreed to terminate their contract, with Johansen moving back to Lyn.

Career statistics

References

1994 births
Living people
Footballers from Oslo
Norwegian expatriates in Belgium
Norwegian footballers
Vålerenga Fotball players
Molde FK players
Eliteserien players
Association football defenders